Shimizuomyces is a genus of fungi within the Clavicipitaceae family.

The genus was circumscribed by Yosio Kobayasi in  Bull. Natl. Sci. Mus. Tokyo B, vol.7 on page 1 in 1981. 

The genus name of Shimizuomyces is in honour of Daisuke Shimizu (1915–1998), who was a Japanese botanist, Lichenologist, Bryologist and mycologist.

Species
As accepted by Species Fungorum;
Shimizuomyces kibianus 
Shimizuomyces paradoxus

References

External links
Index Fungorum

Hypocreales genera
Clavicipitaceae